Tierra Incognita is a Argentinian mystery-horror streaming television series for children and adolescents, which is produced by Non Stop for the Walt Disney Company. The eight-episode first season was released globally on Disney+ on September 8, 2022.

Plot  
Eight years ago, Eric Dalaras' parents mysteriously disappeared without a trace. The teenager is determined to solve his parents' disappearance and enters a scary world. After their parents disappear, Eric and his sister Uma grow up with their maternal grandparents. Eric decides to leave there to search for answers in the town of Cabo Qwert, where he lived as a child. For there is also the abandoned amusement park Tierra Incógnita, where his parents were last stratified. With the help of his friends, his sister and his aunt, Eric must overcome his fears to solve the riddle that leads to the answer to the question that most concerns him. But the truth lies hidden in a cosmos as dark as it is unexplored.

EPISODE 1
Eric receives a video message; ghost hunters exploring Tierra Incognita amusement park see a ghostly hand create a circle on their frosty windshield. Eric runs away from his grandparents under the guise of a school camping trip, instead he returns to Cape Qwert hoping to solve the mystery of what happened to his parents. Meanwhile, his Aunt in Cape Qwert shows tourists ancient cave drawings by the beach. However, the tourists want to go to the haunted amusement park instead of looking at the cave drawings, entry into the amusement park is forbidden. Eric returning to Cape Qwert, meets up with his childhood friend and they start to explore the amusement park, Tierra Incognita. Eric's friend, Pablo explains to Eric the night of the lights when his parents disappeared. Despite Pablo's warning, Eric rushes to the Labyrinth ride where the ghost hunters explored in their video post. Once inside, Eric sees a statue like version of his mother however Pablo rushes through the exit of the ride to pull Eric from the hallucination. Once outside Pablo explains it is only safe to enter thru the exit of rides and that it was not Eric's mother but the park playing tricks.

Cast 
 Pedro Maurizi as Eric Dalaras
 Mora Fisz as Uma
 Tomás Kirzner as Axel
 Carla Pandolfi as Carmen
 Verónica Intile as Julia
 Ezequiel Rodríguez as Roberto
 Osmar Núñez as Santiago
 Silvia Kutika as Aurora
 Thomas Lepera as Pablo
 Azucena Zhou as Lila
 Lautaro Delgado Tymruk as Daniel
 Valentina González as Sabrina
 Fernando Malfitano as Javier
 Joaquín Ochoa as Agustín
 Martín Armendáriz as Guillermo
 Sebastián Sinnot as Federico

Episodes

References

External links 
 
 

2020s mystery television series
2020s horror television series
Television shows filmed in Argentina
Spanish-language television shows
Disney+ original programming